The Beasley Homestead is a historic house and farmstead on US Highway 71 Business (US 71B) in Bethel Heights, Arkansas. The main house, a Bungalow-style single-story structure built in 1927, is of a type common to Benton County in the 1920s. The outbuildings of the farmstead, including a barn, machine shed, and chicken house, were built at the same time and with similar detailing. The complex makes a rare complete and well-preserved farmstead from the period.

The house was listed on the National Register of Historic Places in 1988.

See also
National Register of Historic Places listings in Benton County, Arkansas

References

Houses on the National Register of Historic Places in Arkansas
Houses completed in 1927
Houses in Benton County, Arkansas
National Register of Historic Places in Benton County, Arkansas
1927 establishments in Arkansas
Bungalow architecture in Arkansas
American Craftsman architecture in Arkansas
Farms on the National Register of Historic Places in Arkansas